Herefordshire County Cricket Club, in its current form, was formed in 1992, and first competed in the Minor Counties Championship in their founding season.  They have appeared in fourteen List A matches, making six NatWest Trophy and eight Cheltenham & Gloucester Trophy appearances.  The players in this list have all played at least one List A match.  Herefordshire cricketers who have not represented the county in List A cricket are excluded from the list.

Players are listed in order of appearance, where players made their debut in the same match, they are ordered by batting order.  Players in bold have played first-class cricket.

Key

List of players

List A captains

References

Herefordshire County Cricket Club

Herefordshire
Cricketers